Women's field hockey at the 2002 Asian Games was held in Gangseo Hockey Stadium, Busan from October 5 to October 11, 2002.

Squads

Results
All times are Korea Standard Time (UTC+09:00)

Preliminary round

Pool

Fixtures

Classification round

Bronze-medal match

Gold-medal match

Final standing

References

Results

External links
Official website

2002
Women
2002 in women's field hockey
2002 Asian Games
Field hockey at the 2004 Summer Olympics – Women's qualification
2002